The Orchid Pavilion Gathering of 353 CE, also known as the Lanting Gathering, was a cultural and poetic event during the Jin dynasty (266–420) of the Six Dynasties era, in China. This event itself has a certain inherent and poetic interest in regard to the development of landscape poetry and the philosophical ideas of Zhuangzi. The gathering at the Orchid Pavilion is also famous for the artistry of the calligraphy of Wang Xizhi, who was both one of the participants as well as the author and calligrapher of the Lantingji Xu (Preface to the Poems Composed at the Orchid Pavilion). Sun Chuo also wrote a preface, which is somewhat less famous.

The Orchid Pavilion Gathering of 42 literati included Xie An and Sun Chuo and Wang Pin-Chih at the Orchid Pavilion (Lanting) on Mount Kuaiji just south of Kuaiji (present-day Shaoxing in Zhejiang), during the Spring Purification Festival, on the third day of the third month, to compose poems and drink huangjiu. The gentlemen engaged in a drinking contest known as "floating goblets": rice-wine cups were floated down a small winding creek as the men sat along its banks; whenever a cup stopped, the man closest to the cup was required to empty it and write a poem. In the end, twenty-six of the participants composed thirty-seven poems.

Modern influence
Aside from reproductions of the Lantingji Xu, other influences include the Orchid Pavilion Calligraphy College at Shaoxing University and Jay Chou's recording of a song by Vincent Fang entitled "Lántīng Xù" ("Orchid Pavilion") from his album Capricorn.

Scroll copy of "Lantingji Xu"

Gallery
The events of the Orchid Pavilion Gathering and the ensuing poems have inspired not only generations of poets, but also painters and other artists.

See also
Admonitions Scroll
History of graphic design
Juran (painter)
Lantingji Xu
Orchidaceae
Shangsi Festival
Six Dynasties poetry
Xie An
Zhejiang

Notes

References
Chang, H. C. (1977). Chinese Literature 2: Nature Poetry. (New York: Columbia University Press). 
Swartz, Wendy (2012) "Revisiting the Scene of the Party: A Study of the Lanting Collection", Journal of the American Oriental Society, 132.2 pp.275-300 (http://asianlanguages.rutgers.edu/images/stories/Faculty_Profile/facultydocs/swartz.lanting%20collection.pdf)
Yip, Wai-lim  (1997). Chinese Poetry: An Anthology of Major Modes and Genres . (Durham and London: Duke University Press). 

Poetry festivals in China
Chinese poetry collections
Six Dynasties poetry
353
Cultural festivals in China
Jin dynasty (266–420)